Hodgesiella rebeli is a moth in the family Cosmopterigidae. It is found in Italy, Croatia, Hungary, Romania, North Macedonia, Albania and Greece.

The wingspan is 11–12 mm. The ground colour of the forewings is black with three white lines. The hindwings are whitish grey.

The larvae feed on Convolvulus althaeoides, Convolvulus althaeoides tenuissimus and Convolvulus cantabrica. They mine the leaves of their host plant. The mine starts as a narrow gallery where all the frass is concentrated. This narrow area quickly widens into a large blotch. The larvae create silk, which they deposit in the mine, causing some length folds to develop. The larvae can be found in May.

References

Moths described in 1905
Cosmopteriginae
Moths of Europe